Leicester South is a constituency, recreated in 1974, represented in the House of Commons of the UK Parliament since 2011 by Jonathan Ashworth of the Labour Co-op Party (which denotes he is a member of the Labour Party and Co-operative Party, one of 38 such current Labour MPs, and requires members to contribute practically to a cooperative business). A previous version of the seat existed between 1918 and 1950. Except for a 2004 by-election when it was won by the Liberal Democrats, Leicester South has been held by the Labour Party since 1987.

Boundaries 

1918–1950: The county borough of Leicester wards of Aylstone, Castle, Charnwood, De Montfort, Knighton, Martin's, and Wycliffe.

The initial report of the Boundary Commission for England dated October 1947 and published in December 1947 recommended that Leicester retain three seats, including a revised Leicester South constituency consisting of the wards of Aylestone, De Montfort, Knighton, North Braunstone and Spinney Hill, giving an electorate of 67,574 as of the review date of 15 October 1946. When the Representation of the People Bill enacting the commission's recommendations was debated in the House of Commons, the Government brought forward amendments at Committee stage on 24 March 1948 to allow 17 more constituencies in England. Home Secretary James Chuter Ede announced that the Boundary Commission would be invited to consider an additional constituency to each of nine cities, including Leicester. The Government issued a White Paper proposing the new boundaries which created new borough constituencies of Leicester South East and Leicester South West in place of Leicester South. The Boundary Commission recommended no alteration to the proposals, and the revised constituencies were therefore enacted.

In 1969, the Second Periodical Report of the Parliamentary Boundary Commission for England reduced Leicester from four seats to three, and recreated Leicester South as a borough constituency. 

1974–1983: The county borough of Leicester wards of Aylestone, De Montfort, Knighton, Spinney Hill, The Castle, and Wycliffe wards of Leicester.

1983–2010: The City of Leicester wards of Aylestone, Castle, Crown Hills, East Knighton, Eyres Monsell, Saffron, Spinney Hill, Stoneygate, West Knighton and Wycliffe.

Minor boundary changes were made as a result of the Third Periodical Report of the Boundary Commission in 1983. The new constituency took in about 3,000 voters who were previously in other Leicester seats. No changes were made in the Fourth Periodical Report of the Boundary Commission in 1995.

2010–present: The City of Leicester wards of Aylestone, Castle, Eyres Monsell, Freemen, Knighton, Spinney Hills, and Stoneygate.

In the Fifth Periodical Report of the Boundary Commission in 2007, the constituency had only minor changes with 73 voters being added from Leicester West.

Presently the seat is centred on the southern part of Leicester, and covers leafy suburbs such as Stoneygate and Knighton, inner-city areas with a strong Asian community, and deprived outer estates such as Saffron and Eyres Monsell. Another demographic feature is the presence of a large number of students studying at the University of Leicester and De Montfort University, which are both situated in the constituency.

Constituency profile 
Leicester South is a varied constituency. It contains some of the most pleasant and affluent  areas of Leicester such as Stoneygate, Knighton and Aylestone, as well as more deprived areas such as Saffron and Eyres Monsell. The centre of Leicester, also within the constituency, is more ethnically diverse than the southern part of the area. The seat also contains HM Prison Leicester and both of Leicester's universities.

History 
The seat was held by Derek Spencer for the Conservative Party between the general elections of 1983 and 1987. Its electorate demonstrated increased Labour support thereafter in local and national elections. A 2004 by-election caused by the death of Labour MP Jim Marshall was fought under the shadow of the Iraq War, and was won by Parmjit Singh Gill who became at the time the only Liberal Democrat MP from an ethnic minority. He held the seat for a year before being defeated by Labour candidate Sir Peter Soulsby at the 2005 general election. Soulsby subsequently resigned in order to seek election as Mayor of Leicester in 2011, giving Leicester South its second by-election in the space of seven years; this time the seat was safely held by Labour.

The expansion of the city's suburbs and commuter belt has altered the incomes and other demographic measures of the constituency. The seat saw close contests between Conservative and Labour candidates in the 1980s, with Jim Marshall losing the seat by 7 votes to the Conservatives in the 1983 general election, but regaining it in 1987.

Marshall died in 2004, and the resulting by-election was fiercely contested. As in a by-election in Birmingham Hodge Hill held on the same day, the Liberal Democrat candidates hoped—despite having additional competition for the anti-Iraq War vote from Respect—to build on their previous by-election gain at Brent East. The seat was won by the Liberal Democrat Parmjit Singh Gill, with a majority of 1,654.

Sir Peter Soulsby won the seat at the 2005 election, and was re-elected in 2010. Sir Peter resigned to seek election for the new position of Mayor of Leicester in 2011, triggering a by-election on 5 May 2011, that coincided with the referendum on the voting system. Jonathan Ashworth was elected as his successor, holding the seat for the Labour Party; he was re-elected in 2015 and 2017.

Despite being the only seat in Leicester that has been served by all three major parties in the past 35 years, Leicester South is also currently the safest of the three Labour seats in the city, with a majority in 2017 of 26,261 votes (52.0%), which, as in neighbouring Leicester East, is also the highest-ever majority for Labour in the seat.

Members of Parliament

MPs 1918–1950

MPs since 1974

Elections

Elections in the 2010s

Elections in the 2000s

Elections in the 1990s

Elections in the 1980s

The Conservatives' 7 vote majority made Leicester South their most marginal constituency after the 1983 election and was the closest result in any constituency in the United Kingdom in the election.

Elections in the 1970s

Elections in the 1940s

Elections in the 1930s

Elections in the 1920s

Elections in the 1910s

See also 
 List of parliamentary constituencies in Leicestershire and Rutland

Notes

References

Parliamentary constituencies in Leicestershire
Constituencies of the Parliament of the United Kingdom established in 1918
Constituencies of the Parliament of the United Kingdom disestablished in 1950
Constituencies of the Parliament of the United Kingdom established in 1974
Politics of Leicester